Laverne & Shirley, also known as Laverne & Shirley in the Army, is an American animated television series produced by Hanna-Barbera Productions and Paramount Television broadcast on ABC from October 10, 1981, to November 13, 1982. It is a spin-off of the live-action sitcom Laverne & Shirley with the titular characters voiced by Penny Marshall and Cindy Williams and was loosely based on the 1979 two-part episode "We're in the Army, Now" in which Laverne and Shirley enlisted in the Army.

Overview 
The series is set at Camp Fillmore and follows the comedic antics of roommates Laverne DeFazio and Shirley Feeney as privates with the U.S. Army. The series aired for one season of 13 episodes from October 10, 1981, to January 2, 1982.

The following season, the series was re-titled Laverne & Shirley with The Fonz and combined with a half-hour adaptation of the 1978–1982 sitcom Mork & Mindy to form the Mork & Mindy/Laverne & Shirley/Fonz Hour, which lasted for one season. During the second season, Laverne and Shirley were joined by the characters of The Fonz (voiced by Henry Winkler) and his anthropomorphic dog Mr. Cool (voiced by Frank Welker; from the 1980–81 animated series The Fonz and the Happy Days Gang) working as mechanics in the army camp's motorpool. In August 1982, Cindy Williams quit her role as Shirley on the live-action sitcom Laverne & Shirley and, conversely, Williams' role in the animated series was taken over by Lynne Marie Stewart. Only eight episodes were produced from September 25 to November 13, 1982.

Cast 
 Penny Marshall as Laverne DeFazio
 Cindy Williams (Season 1), and Lynne Marie Stewart (Season 2), as Shirley Feeney
 Ron Palillo as Sgt. Squeally
 Kenneth Mars as Sgt. Turnbuckle
 Henry Winkler (Season 2) as Arthur "The Fonz" Fonzarelli
 Frank Welker as Mr. Cool (Season 2), Additional voices

Additional voices 

 Marlene Aragon (Season 1)
 Rene Auberjonois (Season 1)
 Michael Bell
 Val Bettin (Season 2)
 William Callaway (Season 2)
 Mary Ann Chin (Season 1)
 Philip Lewis Clarke (Season 2)
 Didi Conn (Season 1)
 Henry Corden (Season 1)
 Brad Crandall (Season 1)
 Tandy Cronyn (Season 1)
 Peter Cullen (Season 1)
 Keene Curtis
 Julie McWirter Dees (Season 2)
 Rick Dees (Season 1)
 Jeff Doucette (Season 2)
 Dick Erdman
 Kathy Garver (Season 1)
 Joanie Gerber (Season 1)
 Bob Holt (Season 1)
 Helen Hunt (Season 2)
 Buster Jones (Season 1)
 Jackie Joseph (Season 1)
 Zale Kessler (Season 1)
 Allan Lurie (Season 1)
 Amanda McBroom (Season 1)
 Mitzi McCall (Season 1)
 Joe Medalis (Season 1)
 Allan Melvin (Season 2)
 Pat Parris (Season 1)
 Clare Peck (Season 1)
 Patrick Pinney (Season 1)
 Henry Polic (Season 1)
 Lou Richards (Season 1)
 Bob Ridgley (Season 1)
 Al Robertson (Season 2)
 Marilyn Schreffler (Season 2)
 Hal Smith (Season 2)
 John Stephenson (Season 1)
 Alexandra Stoddart (Season 1)
 Russi Taylor (Season 1)
 Fred Travalena (Season 1)
 B.J. Ward (Season 1)
 Lennie Weinrib (Season 2)

Episodes

Season 1: Laverne & Shirley in the Army (1981–82)

Season 2: Laverne & Shirley with The Fonz (1982)

Home media 
On November 5, 2019, the 13-episode first season was released as a made-on-demand DVD-R by CBS Home Entertainment and Paramount Home Entertainment.

References

External links 
 
 
 Laverne & Shirley in the Army at Toonarific.com

1981 American television series debuts
1982 American television series endings
1980s American animated television series
American Broadcasting Company original programming
English-language television shows
Military comedy television series
Television series by Hanna-Barbera
Television series by CBS Studios
American animated television spin-offs
Happy Days
American children's animated comedy television series
Television series about the United States Army